Cavenago di Brianza (Cavenagh in Milanese) is a comune (municipality) in the Province of Monza and Brianza in the Italian region Lombardy, located about  northeast of Milan.

Cavenago di Brianza borders the following municipalities: Ornago, Burago di Molgora, Basiano, Agrate Brianza, Cambiago.

References

External links
 Official website